The thinlip splitfin (Kaperangus microlepis) is a species of fish in the family Acropomatidae, the lanternbellies. It lives around Africa's Atlantic coast at a depth of 50–500 m and can grow up to 16.5 cm long.

Distribution 
The thinlip splitfin can be found in the Eastern Atlantic from Mauritania to Namibia, including the Cape Verde Islands.

Description 
The thinlip splitfin is dark brownish above and paler below. It has 10 dorsal spines, 9 dorsal soft rays, 2 anal spines, and 9 anal soft rays.

Habitat and biology
It is a predator of crustaceans such as euphasiids, mysids and decapods as well as fish and cephalopods. The species from the family Acropomatidae form loose aggregations normally near the bottom and some of them undertake a nocturnal migration towards the surface of the sea. The highest biomass density was recorded during a survey using a bottom trawl over the upper continental slope off of Angola. It is known to be an important component of the diet of the hake Merluccius senegalensis in the waters off of Dakar.

Taxonomy
Kaperangus microlepis was originally formally described in 1935 as Synagrops microlepis by the British ichthyologist John Roxborough Norman (1898-1944) with the type locality given as "Off St. Paul de Loanda, Angola". In 2017 it was placed in the monotypic genus Kaperangus.

References

Acropomatidae
Taxa named by John Roxborough Norman
Fish described in 1935
Taxobox binomials not recognized by IUCN